Decatising or decatizing, also known as crabbing, blowing, and decating, is the process of making permanent a textile finish on a cloth, so that it does not shrink during garment making. The word comes from the French décatir, which means to remove the cati or finish of the wool. Though used mainly for wool, the term is also applied to processes performed on fabrics of other fibers, such as cotton, linen or polyester.  Crabbing and blowing are minor variations on the general process for wool, which is to roll the cloth onto a roller and blow steam through it.

Decatized wool fabric is interleaved with a cotton, polyester/cotton or polyester fabric and rolled up onto a perforated decatizing drum under controlled tension. The fabric is steamed for up to ten minutes and then cooled down by drawing ambient air through the fabric roll. The piece is then reversed and steamed again in order to ensure that an even treatment is achieved.

There are several quite different types of wool decatizing machines including batch decatizing machines, continuous decatizing machines, wet decatising machines and dry decatizing machines.

References

Further reading 
 
 

Textile treatments
Textile techniques